NGC 5229 is an edge-on spiral galaxy located in the constellation Canes Venatici. It is a member of the M51 Group although in reality it is relatively isolated from other galaxies. The galaxy's disc is somewhat warped and appears to consist of a series of interconnected clusters of stars from our vantage point on Earth. It is approximately 7 kiloparsecs (23,000 light-years) in diameter and is about 13.7 billion years old.

References

External links
 

NGC 5229
NGC 5229
M51 Group
5229
47788
8550